Janetta Vance (16 February 1855 – 15 November 1921) was a British archer.  She competed at the 1908 Summer Olympics in London. Vance competed at the 1908 Games in the only archery event open to women, the double National round.  She took 23rd place in the event with 385 points.

References

External links
 
 
 Janetta Vance's profile at Sports Reference.com

1855 births
1921 deaths
Archers at the 1908 Summer Olympics
Olympic archers of Great Britain
British female archers